Gravy Train is the 1970 debut album by progressive rock band Gravy Train.

Reception
Dave Thompson of AllMusic praised the album, writing of its influences, "Jethro Tull and Comus had a baby, and they named it Gravy Train." He compared the track "Think of Life" to Deep Purple due to its flute part. Thompson noted that, "If Gravy Train has any faults whatsoever, the fascination with peculiar vocal effects can grow a little wearing, especially as frontman Norman Barrett [sic] already appears to have a fabulous range of his own – "Dedication to Sid", in particular, glories in such trickery, although the heartbeat bassline that runs through the number is so hypnotic that it's easy to forget everything else that's going on." He concluded that the album was "a genuine minor classic."

Track listing

Personnel
Norman Barratt – guitar, vocals
Barry Davenport – drums
J.D. Hughes – keyboards, vocals, wind
Lester Williams – bass, vocals

References

1970 debut albums
Gravy Train (band) albums
Vertigo Records albums
Polydor Records albums
Repertoire Records albums
Albums with cover art by Hipgnosis